Manuel Abud is a Mexican-American business and entertainment executive and the current of CEO of the Latin Recording Academy having succeeded Gabriel Abaroa in August 2021. Abud previously served as chief operating officer. An advocate for Latin creators, Abud's passion lies in creating an inclusive cultural institution within The Latin Recording Academy that enables artists and audiences to share their heritage through music. During his time as COO of the academy, Abud oversaw the day-to-day operation of the Latin Academy, including the areas of business development, communications, digital, marketing and production, in addition to spearheading several international and local growth initiatives. While COO of the Latin Academy, Abud successfully led a major reorganization, maximizing efficiencies and taking a swift leap to digital content development. In addition, he further developed a strong and clear positioning for the organization, leveraging its heritage and plans for the future.

Abud's work in U.S. Hispanic media has made him an expert in Latin entertainment. He previously served as president and CEO of Azteca América. Over an impressive media industry career spanning more than 30 years, he has held a wide range of high-level executive positions. He has played a pivotal role in the evolution of the arts and entertainment landscape in U.S. Hispanic media. At Azteca América, he implemented a full-scale turnaround of the network and spearheaded the November 2017 acquisition by HC2 Holdings, Inc.

Prior to Azteca, he held prominent leadership positions at NBC Universal, where he spent more than 14 years as president of the Telemundo Station Group, TV station president and general

manager in the Los Angeles and Dallas markets, and president of Telemundo Cable. Prior to that, Abud was president of CBS Telenoticias. Earlier in his career, he worked for leading Mexican companies Televisa, Medcom and ICA.

In additional to his professional endeavors, Abud serves on the board of councilors at the USC Annenberg School for Communications and Journalism. He has also served on the boards of the Texas Association of Broadcasters, Junior Achievement of Dallas, the YWCA Foundation of Fort Worth, the Tomás Rivera Policy Institute, the Ronald McDonald House of Charities of Southern California and the Pasadena Red Cross, among others.

Abud received a bachelor's degree in accounting from the Instituto Tecnológico Autónomo de México and an MBA from Houston Baptist University. He resides in Miami with his wife of 32 years, Angie. They have three grown children.

Personal life 
Manuel Abud was born in Mexico City, and received a bachelor's degree from the Instituto Tecnológico Autónomo de México in 1986. He earned his MBA from Houston Baptist University, Texas, in 1991.

Boards
Abud currently serves on the Board of Councilors at the USC Annenberg School for Communication and Journalism. In addition, he has served on the boards of the Texas Association of Broadcasters, Junior Achievement of Dallas, the YWCA Foundation of Fort Worth, the Tomás Rivera Policy Institute, the Ronald McDonald House of Charities of Southern California, and the Pasadena Red Cross.

Career

The Latin Recording Academy   
Manuel Abud is the Latin Recording Academy's[32] new CEO and was previously the academy's COO, joining the organization in 2019 and leading the academy through a major reorganization as well as taking a leap into digital content development. Abud also oversees the Latin GRAMMY Cultural Foundation [33], a charitable foundation that, through grants and scholarships, aims to bring awareness and appreciation of the significant contributions of Latin music and its makers of the world. An advocate for Latin creators, Abud's passion lies in creating an inclusive cultural institution within The Latin Recording Academy that enables artists and audiences to share their heritage through music. The Latin Recording Academy strives to nurture, celebrate, honor and elevate Latin music and its makers around the world by being an advocate for Latin creators.

Televisa 
Abud was director of investor relations at Grupo Televisa, where he played a key role in its initial public offering and subsequent listing on the New York Stock Exchange.

Grupo Medcom 
As chief financial officer of Grupo Medcom, which owned radio, television and printed media properties, Abud was in charge of more than 50 corporations, and oversaw the operation of a television station in Guadalajara.

CBS Telenoticias 
He was president of CBS Telenoticias from 1999 to March 2000.  There he re-launched the network as Telemundo Internacional, changing it from an all-news to a news and entertainment format, reaching more than 6 million subscribers.

Mun2 (Now NBC Universo) 
The bilingual cable network for young Hispanics, Mun2, was launched in late 2001. Abud, president, was considered one of the original architects of the channel.

Telemundo Media 
Abud became president of Telemundo Cable in 2000,  a group of cable networks made up of Telemundo Internacional, the news and entertainment channel broadcast to Latin America, the U.S. and Canadian Hispanics.

As part of Telemundo Media, Abud held management positions as TV station general manager at KVEA-TV and KWHY-TV, Los Angeles  and at KXTX-TV, Dallas. On July 12, 2005, Abud testified on behalf of Telemundo before the Senate Commerce, Science and Transportation Committee regarding legislation under consideration to regulate multicasting and the digital conversion of television.

Telemundo Station Group 
In 2012, Abud became president of the Telemundo Station Group. In this role, Abud spearheaded the revitalization of the networks’ local stations strategic direction in the U.S. and Puerto Rico, taking the group to record high profitability levels and increasing the network's local news and programming by an unprecedented 1,500 yearly hours. Abud also increased community engagement for the network through initiatives such as Vota Por Tu Futuro (Vote for Your Future) which targeted voters during the 2012 election year.

Azteca America 
Abud became president and chief executive officer of Azteca America on March 3, 2014, where he reorganized the network and reinforced the company's network and digital sales divisions. New programming initiatives included a bolstered soccer presence; original productions such as telenovelas and comedy shows; an award program to recognize the outstanding achievement of Hispanic Women in the U.S.; and a web series. These strategic changes under Abud's leadership have led the network to increase in market share against its larger competitors.

In November 2015, Azteca America was the fastest-growing Spanish-language network year-over-year among total viewers and A18-49, up 48 percent and 57 percent year-over-year growth in the demos, respectively, according to Nielsen. Reaching more than 9.6 million total viewers and more than 4.2 million A18-49 in prime time, Azteca also delivered the network's highest rated November prime time performance in three years. In April 2016, the network announced the creation of Azteca GlassWorks, its new digital content studio, designed to enhance storytelling and native brand integration for advertisers.

Azteca won the Spanish-language broadcast rights to the Miss Universe 2015 pageant, which aired on the network December 20, 2015. The decision to bid for the broadcast followed controversial remarks from a presidential candidate that led Univision to pull out of the broadcast.

As a keynote speaker at MIPCancun Latin America TV Market and Summit on November 16, 2016, Abud commented on what storytellers can learn from President-elect Donald Trump's general election victory, calling the campaign a “major lesson” for broadcasters and media.

On November 29, 2017, Azteca America announced its acquisition by HC2 Holdings, Inc. from TV Azteca. The transaction, spearheaded by Abud, included in part a multi-year programming and services agreement with TV Azteca's programming and content library in Mexico. The deal with HC2, considered by Abud to be an important transaction in the network's history, will help Azteca expand its reach and become more competitive with the other networks in the U.S. Hispanic landscape. Abud remains at the helm of the network.

Social Responsibility 
Under Abud, Azteca has been involved in several community-growth and social responsibility campaigns through its foundation, Fundación Azteca America.  The network supports Esperanza Azteca, the first U.S.-based Hispanic youth orchestra, which helps underprivileged students develop musical skills, leadership, discipline and teamwork.  In September 2016, Spanish tenor Plácido Domingo performed at a Los Angeles benefit for Esperanza Azteca Los Angeles Youth Orchestra supporting young musicians from the Los Angeles area. Azteca also partnered with Children’s Miracle Network Hospitals for the “Salvé Un Angelito … ¡Te Toca!” fundraising campaign which kicked off in 2015. The campaign raises awareness and funds for Children's Miracle Network Hospitals and pediatric cancer patients.

See also
National Academy of Recording Arts & Sciences
Harvey Mason Jr.

References

External links
The Latin Recording Academy
Latin GRAMMY Cultural Foundation

 

Living people
Businesspeople from Mexico City
American people of Mexican descent
Year of birth missing (living people)
Houston Christian University alumni
Presidents of the Latin Recording Academy